This is the complete list of Asian Games medalists in swimming from 1951 to 2018.

Men

50 m freestyle

100 m freestyle

200 m freestyle

400 m freestyle

800 m freestyle

1500 m freestyle

50 m backstroke

100 m backstroke

200 m backstroke

50 m breaststroke

100 m breaststroke

200 m breaststroke

50 m butterfly

100 m butterfly

200 m butterfly

200 m individual medley

400 m individual medley

4 × 100 m freestyle relay

4 × 200 m freestyle relay

4 × 100 m medley relay
 3 × 100 m medley relay: 1951

Women

50 m freestyle

100 m freestyle

200 m freestyle

400 m freestyle

800 m freestyle

1500 m freestyle

50 m backstroke

100 m backstroke

200 m backstroke

50 m breaststroke

100 m breaststroke

200 m breaststroke

50 m butterfly

100 m butterfly

200 m butterfly

200 m individual medley

400 m individual medley

4 × 100 m freestyle relay

4 × 200 m freestyle relay

4 × 100 m medley relay

Mixed

4 × 100 m medley relay

References 

 Medallists from previous Asian Games – Swimming

External links
Asian Swimming Federation

Swimming
medalists

Asian Games